Douglas Thomas Evans (born June 2, 1963) is a Canadian former professional ice hockey left winger who played in the National Hockey League (NHL) for the St. Louis Blues, Winnipeg Jets, and Philadelphia Flyers. As a youth, he played in the 1976 Quebec International Pee-Wee Hockey Tournament with a minor ice hockey team from Peterborough, Ontario.

Evans is the brother of the NHL hockey players Paul Evans and Kevin Evans.

Career statistics

Regular season and playoffs

References

External links
 

1963 births
Living people
Canadian ice hockey left wingers
Ice hockey people from Ontario
Moncton Hawks players
Peoria Rivermen (ECHL) players
Peoria Rivermen (IHL) players
Peterborough Petes (ice hockey) players
Philadelphia Flyers players
San Jose Rhinos players
Sportspeople from Peterborough, Ontario
St. Louis Vipers players
St. Louis Blues players
Undrafted National Hockey League players
Winnipeg Jets (1979–1996) players